Vasantha Maligai is a 1972 Indian Tamil-language romance film directed by K. S. Prakash Rao and produced by D. Ramanaidu. The film stars Sivaji Ganesan and Vanisri, and is the Tamil remake of the 1971 Telugu film Prema Nagar.

Vasantha Maligai was released on 29 September 1972 and became a major commercial success, running at the box office for nearly 750 days. A digitally restored version of the film was released on 8 March 2013, and another one on 21 June 2019 and it also completed 100 days.

Plot 
Anand is a rich playboy and alcoholic. Aboard an aeroplane, he meets Latha, an air hostess. Latha lives with her father, mother, two brothers, and a sister. Her elder brother resides at home with his wife, but Latha is the highest earning member of the family. Latha's mother objects to her being an air hostess; she begs her to change profession so that she can be home at more decent hours.

While Anand is celebrating his birthday in a pub near his home, Latha arrives at the same pub for a job interview with the manager. However, the lustful manager, in the guise of interviewing her, tries to rape her. Anand hears Latha screaming, subdues the manager, rescues Latha, then drives her home. The next day, Latha goes to Anand's house to return the coat he had lent her the night before. She then asks him for a job, to which he agrees, hiring her as his secretary.

The next day Anand shows her around his house, and she meets his mother, elder brother Vijay, and sister-in-law. Latha soon notices that Anand is an alcoholic, and therefore wishes to resign, but a servant begs her not to because Anand's behaviour has changed for the better since meeting her.

Anand's fiancée comes to his home and starts ranting that she no longer wishes to marry him because he is an alcoholic. Meanwhile, his sister-in-law, who concludes that Latha has come to steal Anand's affections, disturbs his mother with these comments, as well as by the comments of his fiancée. Latha, however, assures the mother, after everyone has left the table, that she will, in fact, try and stop Anand from drinking. Later on, she catches him drinking with his servant Panchavarnam. His servant runs away upon seeing her, but Anand continues to drink. Latha throws the glass after arguing with him, infuriating Anand into throwing a glass bottle onto her forehead.

When Anand realises what he has done, he destroys all his bottles, promising Latha that he will never drink again. He confides in her the anguish of his soul, how when he was young both his father and his Ayya died. After this transformative incident, he announces that he is going to build a new palace for himself and the girl that he truly loves. He will call the palace "Vasantha Maligai" (palace of spring).

Anand brings Latha to this new house; everyone in his family goads Latha to find out who is this mysterious woman that Anand loves. Latha, too, is curious to meet the girl of Anand's heart. He then shows her her own reflection in a separate room revealing that she is the girl of his affections. However, Vijay witnesses this and runs to tell his mother. He conjures a story about Latha having stolen his wife's jewellery. Hearing this, Anand becomes suspicious of Latha. He asks Latha about it, but she runs away, dejected that he could suspect her of such wrongdoing. Fortunately, Anand learns about Vijay's malicious plan.

Anand confesses his ignorance and apologises. But Latha will not forgive him. Anand loses his composure and becomes seriously ill. Meanwhile, Latha receives a marriage proposal. Anand's mother goes to apologise to Latha while Latha hands her an invitation to her wedding. Anand's mother shows this to her son, who then decides to attend the wedding and Latha is shocked to see him. She meets him privately to reconcile their differences, but her sister-in-law and the groom's mother spot them and announce it to the guests who depart, botching Latha's marriage. All of a sudden, Anand's mother enters the room and declares that Latha should marry Anand. When Latha arrives at the palace, she is shocked to see Anand's condition. She does not know that out of desperation and lovesickness he drank poison. As soon as Latha enters the room he collapses. Anand is hospitalised and after recovering, re-unites with Latha.

Cast 
Lead
Sivaji Ganesan as Ananth 
Vanisri as Latha

Supporting actors
K. Balaji as Vijay Kumar "Vijay"
Major Sundarrajan as Latha's father
Nagesh as Panchavarnam
V. S. Raghavan as Ponnaiya
Srikanth as Latha's elder brother
S. V. Ramadas as the hotel manager
Senthamarai as Jameen property Diwan
C. R. Parthiban as an aeroplane passenger

Supporting actresses
Santha Kumari as Jameendarani, Anand and Vijay's mother
Pandari Bai as Latha's mother
Sukumari as Vimala, Vijay's wife
Kumari Padmini as Sreekanth's wife
Rama Prabha as Panchavarnam's lover
Sridevi as Vijay's daughter

Dancers
C. I. D Sakunthala as Dancer
Haalam as Dancer
L. Kanchana as Dancer

Guest appearances
S. V. Ranga Rao as Jameendar, Anand and Vijay's father
V. K. Ramasamy as Anand's home butler
T. K. Bhagavathi as (Guest Role)
C. K. Saraswathi as (Guest Role)
Pushpalatha as Anand's guardian (Aaya)

Production 
Vasantha Maligai is a remake of the 1971 Telugu film Prema Nagar. D. Ramanaidu, the producer of the Telugu film, returned to produce the Tamil remake. A. Vincent worked as the cinematographer. J. Jayalalithaa initially signed on to play the female lead, but could not continue due to her mother's death; the role later went to Vanisri.

Soundtrack 
The music was composed by K. V. Mahadevan. The song "Oru Kinnathai" was remixed by Yathish Mahadev in Indira Vizha (2009).

Release and reception 
Vasantha Maligai was released on 29 September 1972. Kanthan of Kalki praised Vanisri's performance, but criticised the screenplay. The film was one of the biggest successes for Ganesan, running for over 750 days in theatres. It held the record of running the highest continuous full-house showings in Madras. The film had 271 continuous full-house screenings in all the three theatres it was released, namely, Shanthi, Crown, and Bhuvaneswari. It was also successful in Sri Lanka where it ran for more than 250 days. The film initially had Anand dying in the climax, but three days after its release it was changed into one where he survives.

Re-releases

Theatrical 
A digitally restored version of Vasantha Maligai was released on 8 March 2013. The restoration was done by P. Srinivasan of Sai Ganesh Films at a cost of INR 10 million, consuming five months of work. M. Suganth of The Times of India rated the digital version 4.5 out of 5 stars saying, "To be frank, the opening 20 minutes are as choppy a ride as that experienced by the characters in the introductory scene." He continued, "But forget K V Mahadevan's songs, forget Krishnarao's dazzling sets and forget the leading man. This film still holds up so well – 40 years after its release – because of the writing and characterisation. Yes, for a film that is dismissed as melodramatic romance, the writing (Balamurugan) is quite nuanced." He concludes that the film is "further proof that old is indeed gold."

Another digitally restored version was released on 21 June 2019. The restoration on this version was done by Groupcom Systems who remastered it in Di colour, besides other technology upgrades such as DTS, 4K Sony and 2K Qube.

Home media 
Vasantha Maligai is included alongside various other hit Sivaji Ganesan films in the compilation DVD 8 Ulaga Adhisayam Sivaji.

In popular culture 
In Kalyana Galatta (1998), Rajagopalan (Sathyaraj) does a spoof on song "Yaarukkaga" and imitates Anand's mannerisms. In En Purushan Kuzhandhai Maadhiri (2001), Angusaamy (Vadivelu) who is drunk will be seen singing "Kudimagane". In Manal Kayiru (1982), Kittumani (S. Ve. Shekher) sings "Yemandha Sonagiri" with his situation being similar to Anand. In Sivaji (2007), the title character (Rajinikanth) and Tamizhselvi (Shriya Saran) imitate the song "Mayakkam Enna".
In pitha magan movie , Surya and simran dances for various old songs combined together  in which there is a song from vasantha maaligai " Oru kinnathai enthuginren "

References

External links 
 

1970s romance films
1970s Tamil-language films
1972 films
Films about alcoholism
Films directed by K. S. Prakash Rao
Films scored by K. V. Mahadevan
Indian romance films
Suresh Productions films
Tamil remakes of Telugu films